In the Realms of the Unreal is a 2004 American documentary film written and directed by Jessica Yu about American outsider artist Henry Darger (1892–1973).

Summary
An obscure janitor during his life, Darger is known for the posthumous discovery of his elaborate 15,145-page fantasy manuscript entitled The Story of the Vivian Girls, in What is Known as the Realms of the Unreal, of the Glandeco-Angelinnian War Storm, Caused by the Child Slave Rebellion, along with several hundred watercolor paintings, collages and other drawings illustrating the story.

Content
The film's style is atypical of a documentary. Because there are only three known photographs of Darger, and because of his reclusive lifestyle, the film is mostly a narrated biographical account, accompanied by animated versions of events from his magnum opus, which is also surveyed in detail. Interviews with his few neighbors and other acquaintances are included. The film's use of a child actor as its narrator is also unconventional as Dakota Fanning was only seven years old when she narrated the film.

Reception
The film has a 70% rating on Rotten Tomatoes and a score of 74 on Metacritic.

Accolades
The film won the National Film Board Award for Best Documentary at the 2004 Vancouver International Film Festival while it was also nominated for Best Documentary Screenplay from the Writers Guild of America and a Gotham Award for Best Documentary.

References

External links
In the Realms of the Unreal at PBS.org

Official website

2004 films
2004 animated films
2004 documentary films
2000s American films
2000s English-language films
American films with live action and animation
American animated documentary films
Collage film
Documentary films about painters
Films directed by Jessica Yu
Films scored by Jeff Beal
POV (TV series) films
Works about outsider art